Kårvåg is a village in Averøy Municipality in Møre og Romsdal county, Norway.  It is located on the west side of the island of Averøya near the east end of the Atlanterhavsveien road.  The village of Kornstad lies to the south and the village of Langøyneset is to the north.  

References

Averøy
Villages in Møre og Romsdal